Arisa Satō (佐藤あり紗, Satō Arisa, born 18 July 1989) is a Japanese volleyball player who plays for Hitachi Rivale. She also plays for Japan women's national volleyball team.

Clubs 
  Furukawa Gakuen Highschool
  Tohoku Fukushi University
  Hitachi Rivale (2012-)

Awards

Individual 
2013 - V.Challenge League Serve Receive Award
2013 - World Grand Champions Cup Best Libero
 2013-14 V.Premier League - Best Receive Award

Team 
 2013 - V.challenge League -  Runner-Up, with Hitachi Rivale

National Team 
 2013 - Asian Championship  Silver medal
 2013 - World Grand Champions Cup  Bronze medal

References

External links 
 FIVB - Biography
 V.League(Japan) - Biography
 Personal Website

Japanese women's volleyball players
Sportspeople from Sendai
1989 births
Living people
Japan women's international volleyball players
Olympic volleyball players of Japan
Volleyball players at the 2016 Summer Olympics